The 1973–74 UEFA Cup was the third season of the UEFA Cup since its inception in 1971. It was won by Dutch side Feyenoord who defeated English side Tottenham Hotspur 4–2 on aggregate after two matches.

First round

|}

First leg

Second leg

Dynamo Kyiv won 5–0 on aggregate.

Ruch Chorzów won 8–6 on aggregate.

B 1903 won 3–2 on aggregate.

Carl Zeiss Jena won 6–0 on aggregate.

Leeds United won 7–2 on aggregate.

Feyenoord won 5–2 on aggregate.

Hibernian won 3–1 on aggregate.

Nice won 3–2 on aggregate.

Fortuna Düsseldorf won 3–2 on aggregate.

Tottenham Hotspur won 9–2 on aggregate.

Aberdeen won 7–2 on aggregate.

Twente won 7–3 on aggregate.

Molenbeek won 4–2 on aggregate.

Wolverhampton Wanderers won 4–1 on aggregate.

Marseille won 12–1 on aggregate.

Vitória Setúbal won 4–0 on aggregate.

Ipswich Town won 1–0 on aggregate.

Lazio won 4–3 on aggregate.

Lokomotiv Plovdiv won 3–0 on aggregate.

Universitatea Craiova won 1–0 on aggregate.

Gwardia Warsaw won 3–1 on aggregate.

Stuttgart won 13–0 on aggregate.

Tatran Prešov won 5–3 on aggregate.

Dinamo Tbilisi won 5–3 on aggregate.

2-2 on aggregate, OFK Beograd won on away goals rule.

2–2 on aggregate. Admira/Wacker won on away goals rule.

Fenerbahçe won 6–2 on aggregate.

Honvéd won 5–3 on aggregate.

Lokomotive Leipzig won 4–2 on aggregate.

Köln won 2–0 on aggregate.

Panachaiki won 3–1 on aggregate.

Standard Liège won 8–4 on aggregate.

Second round

|}

First leg

Second leg

Fortuna Düsseldorf won 4–2 on aggregate.

Tottenham Hotspur won 5–2 on aggregate.

Dinamo Tbilisi won 8–1 on aggregate.

Nice won 4–2 on aggregate.

4–4 on aggregate; Lokomotive Leipzig won on away goals rule.

Twente won 8–1 on aggregate.

2–2 on aggregate, Vitória Setúbal won on away goals rule.

Köln won 6–2 on aggregate.

Ipswich Town won 6–4 on aggregate.

Dynamo Kyiv won 3–1 on aggregate.

Honvéd won 7–5 on aggregate.

Ruch Chorzów won 3–1 on aggregate.

Stuttgart won 8–4 on aggregate.

0–0 on aggregate, Leeds United won in penalty shootout.

Feyenoord won 3–2 on aggregate.

Standard Liège won 3–1 on aggregate.

Third round

|}

First leg

Second leg

Stuttgart won 3–2 on aggregate.

Tottenham Hotspur won 6–2 on aggregate.

Ipswich Town won 3–1 on aggregate.

Ruch Chorzów won 5–2 on aggregate.

Vitória Setúbal won 3–2 on aggregate.

Lokomotive Leipzig won 4–2 on aggregate.

Köln won 4–1 on aggregate.

3–3 on aggregate, Feyenoord won on away goals rule.

Quarter-finals

|}

First leg

Second leg

1–1 on aggregate, Lokomotive Leipzig won in penalty shoot-out.

Tottenham Hotspur won 5–1 on aggregate.

Stuttgart won 3–2 on aggregate.

Feyenoord won 4–2 on aggregate.

Semi-finals

|}

First leg

Second leg

Tottenham Hotspur won 4–1 on aggregate.

Feyenoord won 4–3 on aggregate.

Final

First leg

Second leg

Feyenoord won 4–2 on aggregate.

External links
1973–74 All matches UEFA Cup – season at UEFA website
Official Site
Results at RSSSF.com
 All scorers 1973–74 UEFA Cup according to protocols UEFA
1973/74 UEFA Cup - results and line-ups (archive)

UEFA Cup seasons
2